Adeyinka Olatokunbo Asekun (born 11 June 1956 in Nigeria) is a Nigerian banker and diplomat. He is the current Nigerian Ambassador to Canada.

Education 
Asekun attended the University of Wisconsin where he studied Business Administration and obtained a BSc in Business Administration majoring in Marketing. He also attended California State University and obtained an MBA.

References 

Living people
1956 births
Nigerian businesspeople
Nigerian business executives
Nigerian bankers
Nigerian diplomats